Senegal has sent athletes to all Summer Olympic Games held since 1964.  Unlike most surrounding nations, Senegal has never missed any Summer Olympics since its independence.  Only once has the country won an  Olympic medal: Amadou Dia Ba, who won a silver medal in the men's 400 metre hurdles in 1988. However, Abdoulaye Seye, representing France, won a bronze medal in the 200 metres in 1960, just two months after the short lived Mali Federation gained independence and a few days after Senegal seceded from the federation.

Senegal is among the small group of tropical countries that have participated in the Winter Olympic Games.  Its winter athletes have participated in five Winter Olympics since 1984, although they have won no medals. Senegal was represented at the 1984, 1992 and 1994 by Lamine Guèye, and in 2006 and 2010 by Leyti Seck.

Medal tables

Medals by Summer Games

Medals by Winter Games

Medals by sport

List of medalists

See also
 List of flag bearers for Senegal at the Olympics
 Senegal at the Paralympics
 Tropical nations at the Winter Olympics

External links